The All England Cup is a greyhound racing competition held annually. It was inaugurated in 1938 at Brough Park later known as Newcastle.

History was made during the 1946 running when four of the entries were the four nations Derby winners. The English Greyhound Derby winner Mondays News, the Irish Greyhound Derby champion Lilac Lady, Welsh Greyhound Derby winner Negro's Lad and Scottish Greyhound Derby champion Lattin Pearl all competed. The hope that all four would progress to the final failed to materialise but two of them Monday's News and Lattin Pearl did make the final and duly finished first and second.

In 2022, the first prize was increased to £20,000 under the sponsorship of Premier Greyhound Racing.

Past winners

Venues 
1938–present (Brough Park/Newcastle 480m)

Sponsors
2005–2018 (William Hill)
2019–2019 (Alconex)
2020–2020 (Racing Post GTV)
2021–2021 (Arena Racing Company)
2022-2022 (Premier Greyhound Racing)

Winning Trainers
Charlie Lister 6
Angela Harrison 3
Harry Williams 3
Jim Hookway 3

References

Greyhound racing competitions in the United Kingdom
Sport in Newcastle upon Tyne
Recurring sporting events established in 1938